Sauris interruptata is a moth of the family Geometridae first described by Frederic Moore in 1888. It is found in India's north-east Himalayas, Sri Lanka, the Ryukyu Islands, Taiwan, Myanmar, Peninsular Malaysia, Borneo, the Philippines, and possibly the Moluccas and New Guinea.

References

Moths of Asia
Moths described in 1888